This page lists board and card games, wargames, miniatures games, and tabletop role-playing games published in 1997.  For video games, see 1997 in video gaming.

Games released or invented in 1997

Game awards given in 1997
 Spiel des Jahres: Mississippi Queen - Werner Hodel, Goldsieber
 Games: Quoridor

Significant games-related events in 1997
Eden Studios, Inc. founded by George Vasilakos and M. Alexander Jurkat.
 TSR, Inc., the owner of the Dungeons & Dragons tabletop role-playing game, was acquired by Wizards of the Coast.

Deaths

See also
 1997 in video gaming

Games
Games by year